Song Exploder is a music podcast created by Hrishikesh Hirway, who hosted it from its 2014 inception until late 2018 and again from December 2019 onwards. In January 2019, Thao Nguyen became a guest host for the year, with Christian Koons serving as producer, and Hirway moving to executive producer. The biweekly show features musicians talking about the creative process behind an individual song while "deconstructing" the song into its component parts. As of 2021, the show's team is composed of host and producer Hirway, illustrator Carlos Lerma, and  Music Clearance Director Kathleen Smith.

The podcast launched on the Maximum Fun network, became independent in February 2015 and joined Radiotopia in June 2015.

Format
Each episode begins with the host introducing the show's featured musician (or musicians) and giving a brief history of the musical act or television program with which they are associated. The artist then discusses the creative process used in the creation of a particular song. This may include anything from songwriting to recording to post-production. The discussion is interspersed with short clips of separate tracks from the song isolated to illustrate the topics being discussed – for example, the drum track might be played to demonstrate how a particular beat was used in the song. The episode ends by playing a recording of the featured song in its entirety. Hirway edits his side of the conversation out of the recording with the purpose of condensing the contents of the podcast around the song's creation and how the artist brought it to life.

Subjects
Song Exploder has explored the music of: U2, Metallica, Alicia Keys, Norah Jones, Fleet Foxes, R.E.M., Arcade Fire, Fleetwood Mac, Sheryl Crow, The 1975, and Dua Lipa, among many more.

The podcast has also deconstructed the theme music of: House of Cards, Downton Abbey, and Game of Thrones.

Furthermore, Song Exploder has analysed the La La Land, Moonlight, and Black Panther film scores.

In addition to theme music and film scores, the podcast has taken an in-depth look at the Watch Dogs video game music and The Daily podcast theme.

Reception
The show receives generally positive reception and has been featured at the Sundance Film Festival, SXSW, Noise Pop Festival, and Moogfest.Vulture said, "Song Exploder is probably the best use of the podcast format ever," and named it one of the Top 10 Podcasts of 2015. It was also named Best of iTunes in 2015, and Quartz named it the Best Podcast of 2015, saying, "It is possibly the most perfect podcast, really." Pete Naughton of The Daily Telegraph called Song Exploder an "excellent podcast" and placed it on his list of top music podcasts in August 2014. The A.V. Club praised the podcast's "beautiful production and thoughtful editing" in June 2014. It has also received favorable reviews from Spin, Gizmodo, Slate, and The Atlantic.

Creator Hirway has mentioned Song Exploder at prestigious conferences like the Google Design Conference and AIGA Design Conference. In 2016, the Sydney Opera House hosted a Song Exploder Residency.

The show won the 2016 and 2017 Academy of Podcasters award for best music podcast.

Awards

TV show
On September 17, 2020, a television series based on the podcast was announced, which premiered on October 2, 2020 on Netflix, with 4 episodes:

Volume 1 (2020)

Volume 2 (2020)

Episode list

See also 

 Music podcast

References

External links

2014 podcast debuts
Audio podcasts
Maximum Fun
Music podcasts
Radiotopia
Podcasts adapted into television shows